Fistularia corneta, commonly known as the Pacific cornetfish or the deepwater cornetfish, is a marine fish in the family Fistulariidae. It is endemic to the eastern Pacific Ocean, being found from California to Peru, including many offshore islands. F. corneta feeds on small fishes, and itself is most commonly used by humans as processed fishmeal, which can be marketed as fresh, salted or dried. It is an oviparous species.

References

Further reading

WoRMS
Discover Life

Fistulariidae
Marine fish
Taxa named by Charles Henry Gilbert
Taxa named by Edwin Chapin Starks
Fish described in 1904